Michael Earl Payne (November 15, 1961 – August 4, 2002) was a Major League Baseball pitcher. He played one season with the Atlanta Braves in 1984. Mike Payne was also a baseball coach for Dunnellon High School in Dunnellon, FL. He worked at the school through the week as an Automotive Technology Instructor.

Payne died on August 4, 2002 after a year-long battle with Eastern equine encephalitis, which he contracted from being bitten by a mosquito in the summer of 2001.

References

External links

Atlanta Braves players
1961 births
2002 deaths
Infectious disease deaths in Florida
Baseball players from Rhode Island
People from Woonsocket, Rhode Island
Major League Baseball pitchers
Kingsport Braves players
Anderson Braves players
Durham Bulls players
Savannah Braves players
Richmond Braves players
Sumter Braves players
Jacksonville Expos players
People from Dunnellon, Florida